The 2019 Limpopo provincial election was held on 8 May 2019 to elect the 49 members of the Limpopo Provincial Legislature. It was held on the same day as the 2019 South African general election. The election was won by the African National Congress, the incumbent governing party in the province.

Premier candidates
The African National Congress (ANC) did not announce a candidate for premier prior to the election. Incumbent premier and ANC provincial chairperson Stanley Mathabatha headed the ANC's list. After the election, the ANC National Executive Committee announced Mathabatha as the party's premier candidate.

The Economic Freedom Fighters (EFF) did not field a premier candidate because the party seeks to abolish provincial governments. Jossey Buthane, the party's provincial chair, headed the EFF list.

The Democratic Alliance (DA) chose their provincial leader and current member of the legislature, Jacques Smalle, as its premier candidate.

Mogalakwena Local Municipality councillor Marcelle Maritz was the Freedom Front Plus's premier candidate.

Results

References

2019 elections in South Africa